The 2010–11 season was Blackburn Rovers' 123rd season as a professional football club. The 2010–11 season was also Blackburn Rovers' 17th season in the Premier League, and their 10th consecutive season in the top division of English football.

In November 2010, the Indian company V H Group bought Blackburn Rovers under the name of Venky's London Limited for £23 million. A few weeks later the new owners sacked manager Sam Allardyce and replaced him with first-team coach Steve Kean, initially on a temporary basis, but by January 2011 he had been awarded a full-time contract until June 2013. Kean's appointment was shrouded in a great deal of controversy since his agent Jerome Anderson had earlier played a major role in advising Venky's during the takeover of the club in the preceding months.

First-team squad

Club

Technical staff

Medical staff

Results

Pre-season

Premier League

League table

Results summary

Results per matchday

August

September

October

November

December

January

February

March

April

May

League Cup

FA Cup

Statistics

Goal scorers

Transfers

In

Total spending:  Undisclosed (est. £3,872,000+)

Loan in

Out

Total income:  Undisclosed (nominal)

Loan out

Notes

References

External links
Blackburn Rovers F.C. official website

Blackburn Rovers F.C. seasons
Blackburn Rovers